Gratz College is a private Jewish college in Melrose Park, Pennsylvania. The college traces its origins to 1856 when banker, philanthropist, and communal leader Hyman Gratz and the Hebrew Education Society of Philadelphia (established in 1849 by Rebecca Gratz and Isaac Leeser) joined to establish a trust to create a Hebrew teachers college. Gratz is a private liberal arts college located in a suburban setting and is primarily a commuter campus with online courses.

In addition to its undergraduate, graduate certificate, master's, and doctoral programs, Gratz also runs cultural programs, adult education offerings, a Jewish Community High School, and the Tuttleman Library for Jewish studies. Gratz also operates distance learning programs, including the first online Master of Arts in Holocaust and Genocide Studies.

History

In 1856, Hyman Gratz signed a Deed of Trust to create a college after his death if various heirs died without children.  The trust provided for "the establishment and support of a college for the education of Jews residing in the city and county of Philadelphia”.
Hyman Gratz died on January 27, 1857, at age 81, and on October 15, 1893, the last heir named in the will died without any children. Thus the Gratz estate became available to create the college. On March 20, 1895, the trustees responsible for creating the college received slightly over  $105,000 from the trust to create the college.  The college was officially founded in February, 1895. Starting in October 1895, the college sponsored various lectures and other educational programs.

In 1897, under the leadership of Board President, Moses A. Dropsie,  Gratz College hired the first three faculty members: Henry M. Speaker (Principal, Jewish Literature), Arthur A. Dembitz (Jewish History), Isaac Husik (Hebrew Language). Classes officially began in January, 1898. Henry M. Speaker was an 1894 graduate of the Jewish Theological Seminary of America where he studied Jewish Education. Isaac Husik, while teaching at Gratz, received his Ph.D. in Philosophy from University of Pennsylvania in 1902. He remained on the Gratz faculty until 1916 when he became a professor of philosophy at the University of Pennsylvania. Arthur Dembitz was the first cousin of Louis Dembitz Brandeis who at the time was one of the leading Jewish attorneys in the United States and in 1916 became the first Jew to serve on the US Supreme Court.

Following the model of the early Jewish educator, Rebecca Gratz (Hyman's sister), the first classes at Gratz College were focused on the training of teachers. Women were accepted and educated on the same basis as men. There were eight women and five men in the first 'afternoon' class and the first evening class had twelve women and nine men.  Women were inspired to gain training and enrolled in Gratz to become teachers of various aspects of Jewish culture, literature, history and language.

Academics

Graduate programs

Gratz College has two doctoral programs: Doctor of Holocaust and Genocide Studies (Ph.D.) and Doctor of Education in Leadership (Ed.D.). Gratz master's degree (MA and MS) programs include Master of Arts in Education (M.Ed.), Master of Science in Teaching Practice, Master of Arts in Holocaust and Genocide Studies, Master of Arts in Human Rights, Master of Arts in Jewish Professional Studies, Master of Arts in Jewish Communal Service, Master of Arts in Jewish Studies, and Master of Science in Nonprofit Management. In 2018, Gratz initiated a new program, a Master of Arts in Interfaith Leadership, and in 2019 the school initiated a Master of Science in Camp Administration and Leadership.

Gratz College is "the only institution in the United States to offer an actual Doctor of Holocaust and Genocide Studies degree, as opposed to a Ph.D. in a related discipline, like history or sociology." The newly available doctorate is the first-ever online Ph.D. in Holocaust and Genocide Studies.

Undergraduate programs

Gratz offers undergraduate degree programs in Jewish Professional Studies, Jewish Studies, and Human Rights. In addition, an undergraduate certificate in Jewish Education is offered as a starting point or boost to those already in Jewish educational settings and an Early Childhood Director Credential Certificate.

Graduate Certificate Programs

In addition to their full degree programs, Gratz offers Graduate Certificate Programs in Education, Master's Plus in Distinguished Teaching and Learning (Education), Holocaust and Genocide Studies, Jewish Nonprofit Management, Jewish Studies, Jewish Communal Service, and Nonprofit Management.

Adult Continuing Education

Professional Development courses for educators (CEU) and Continuing Legal Education (CLE) opportunities are offered every year to surrounding area professionals.  In addition, the local community is offered 'Lunch and Learn', an educational speaker series held monthly.

Organization and Administration

Gratz College is a not-for-profit educational institution governed by a 31-member Board of Governors. The current chair is Kathleen Elias, the immediate past chair is Rabbi Lance Sussman. Historically, most members of the Board of Governors lived in greater Philadelphia, however the current board also has members in New Jersey, Maryland, and British Columbia. The current president of Gratz College is Zev Eleff, Ph.D. who took office in September 2021. The Dean of the college is Honour Moore, Ed.D.

Accreditation

Gratz is regionally accredited through the Middle States Association of Colleges and Schools. Gratz was first accredited in 1967 and in 2019 was reaccredited. The 2015 Carnegie Classification is Special Focus Four-Year - Other Special Focus Institutions.

Notable alumni

 Berenice Victoria Abrams (1936), social worker, Jewish activist, philanthropist 
 Gershon Agron, Mayor of Jerusalem 1955–1959
 Lori Alhadeff, activist and member of the Broward County School Board
 Mark B. Cohen (1972), Common Pleas Court Judge, Philadelphia (2018–present), House of Representatives (1974–2016)
 Arnold Dashefsky (1963), Professor of Sociology at University of Connecticut, Director of the North American Jewish databank
 Isidore Dyen, linguist, Professor Emeritus of Malayo-Polynesian and Comparative Linguistics at Yale University
 Louis Fischer, journalist, author, winner of National Book Award (1965) for The Life of Lenin
 David J. Galter, newspaper editor, born: Bialystok, Russia (now Poland). Editor at The Jewish World, Jewish Telegraphic Agency (JTA), and Jewish Current News. Editor-in-Chief of the Philadelphia Jewish Exponent (1933–1953)
 Eric Goldman (1970), film historian, educator 
 Rabbi Israel Goldstein (1911), scholar, author, Rabbi of Congregation B'nai Jeshurun (Manhattan) on New York's Upper West Side (1918–1960), Founder of Brandeis University (1946), President of The Jewish National Fund of America (1934–1943)
 Cyrus H. Gordon, scholar of Near Eastern cultures and ancient languages
 Rabbi Samuel K Joseph, Eleanor Sinsheimer Distinguished Service Professorship of Jewish Education and Leadership Development, Hebrew Union College
 Rabbi William E. Kaufman, author of books on Jewish Philosophy
 Diane King (1943), professor, scholar, Lifetime Achievement Award of the Jewish Educators Assembly
 Samuel Noah Kramer, author, leading Assyriologist, expert in Sumerian history and Sumerian language, Professor at University of Pennsylvania
 Sora Eisenberg Landes (1950), Jewish Educator, founding principal of the Forman Center of the Perelman Jewish Day School in Greater Philadelphia
 Michael Levin (soldier) – American born soldier in the Paratroopers Brigade of the Israel Defense Forces (IDF), KIA 2006 in Lebanon
 Sandra Ostrowicz Lilenthal, educator, curriculum developer, scholar, 2015 Covenant Award Recipient
 Noam Pitlik, actor, director, 1979 Emmy winner for Outstanding Directing for a Comedy Series
 Claire Polin, American composer of contemporary classical music, musicologist, and flutist
 Rabbi Sandy Eisenberg Sasso, author, first woman rabbi in Reconstructionaist Judaism, with her husband formed the first rabbinical couple in Jewish History Sandy Sasso ordained as first female Reconstructionist rabbi
 Rose (Schwartz) Schmukler (1931), artist, poet
 Saul Wachs, Ph.D. (1951), educator, Jewish scholar, author

See also 
 List of Jewish universities and colleges in the United States

References

External links

 
Educational institutions established in 1895
Jewish universities and colleges in the United States
Jews and Judaism in Pennsylvania
Universities and colleges in Montgomery County, Pennsylvania
1895 establishments in Pennsylvania
Cheltenham Township, Pennsylvania
Private universities and colleges in Pennsylvania